State Route 213 (SR 213) is part of Maine's system of numbered state highways, located entirely in Lincoln County. It runs from SR 215 in Newcastle to SR 126 at Jefferson. For the entire length, the route is known as Bunker Hill Road.

Junction list

References

External links

Floodgap Roadgap's RoadsAroundME: Maine State Route 213

213
Transportation in Lincoln County, Maine